Giulio Capitanio (born Schilpario, 6 March 1952) was an Italian cross-country skier who competed in the late 1970s and early 1980s. Competing in three Winter Olympics in the 4 × 10 km relay, he earned his best finish of sixth at Lake Placid, New York in 1980.

Capitanio's best World Cup finish was fourth in a 30 km event in Yugoslavia in 1983.

Cross-country skiing results
All results are sourced from the International Ski Federation (FIS).

Olympic Games

World Championships

World Cup

Season standings

References

Wallenchinsky, David. (1984). The Complete Book of the Olympics: 1896-1980. New York: Penguin Books. p. 619.

External links

 Capitanio Giulio 

Cross-country skiers at the 1976 Winter Olympics
Cross-country skiers at the 1980 Winter Olympics
Cross-country skiers at the 1984 Winter Olympics
Italian male cross-country skiers
People from Schilpario
Living people
1952 births
Olympic cross-country skiers of Italy
Sportspeople from the Province of Bergamo